Eucalyptus globulus subsp. maidenii, commonly known as Maiden's gum, is a subspecies of tree that is endemic to southeastern Australia. It has mostly smooth bark with some persistent slabs of old bark at the base, juvenile leaves with one glaucous side, lance-shaped adult leaves, flower buds arranged in groups of seven, white flowers and conical, pedicellate, sometimes glaucous fruit that is more or less square in cross-section

Description
The bark is mostly smooth, shedding in long strips to leave a white or greyish surface. There is sometimes rough, partially shed bark at the base of the trunk and ribbons of shedding bark in the upper branches. Young plants and coppice regrowth have stems that are more or less square in cross-section, with a prominent wing on each corner.

Flowering has been recorded in March and the flowers are white.

Taxonomy and naming
Maiden's gum was first formally described in 1890 by Ferdinand von Mueller who gave it the name Eucalyptus maidenii and published the description in Proceedings of the Linnean Society of New South Wales from collections by William Bäuerlen. In 1974, James Barrie Kirkpatrick described four subspecies of E. globulus and changed the name E. maidenii to E. globulus subsp. maidenii. The epithet maidenii honours Joseph Maiden.

Distribution and habitat
This subspecies of E. globulus grows in forest in mountain valleys, on slopes and ridges in near-coastal ranges of New South Wales south of the Shoalhaven River and in eastern Victoria near the upper reaches of the Genoa and Cann Rivers.

References

globulus
Myrtales of Australia
Trees of Australia
Flora of New South Wales
Flora of Victoria (Australia)
Plants described in 1890
Taxa named by Ferdinand von Mueller